Bharuch Lok Sabha constituency (formerly known as Broach Lok Sabha constituency) is one of the 26 Lok Sabha (parliamentary)  constituencies in Gujarat state in western India.

Vidhan Sabha segments
Presently, Bharuch Lok Sabha constituency comprises seven assembly segments. These are:

Members of Lok Sabha

^ bypoll

General Elections Results

General Election 1962
 Chhotubhai Makanbhai Patel (INC) : 130,060 votes
 Lilavati Kanhaiyalal Munshi (Swatantra Party) : 102,023

General Election 1977
 Ahmed Patel (Congress) : 189,815 votes 
 Unia Suleman Essuf (Janata Party) : 126,936

General Election 1989
 Deshmukh Chandubhai Shambhai (BJP) : 360,381 votes  
 Ahemadbhai Mahmmadbhai Patel (INC) : 245,046

General Election 2004

General Election 2009

General Election 2014

General Election 2019

See also
 Bharuch district
 List of Constituencies of the Lok Sabha

Notes

Lok Sabha constituencies in Gujarat
Bharuch district